In graph theory, a star  is the complete bipartite graph  a tree with one internal node and  leaves (but no internal nodes and  leaves when ).  Alternatively, some authors define  to be the tree of order  with maximum diameter 2; in which case a star of  has  leaves.

A star with 3 edges is called a claw.

The star  is edge-graceful when  is even and not when  is odd. It is an edge-transitive matchstick graph, and has diameter 2 (when ), girth ∞ (it has no cycles), chromatic index , and chromatic number 2 (when ). Additionally, the star has large automorphism group, namely, the symmetric group on  letters.

Stars may also be described as the only connected graphs in which at most one vertex has degree greater than one.

Relation to other graph families
Claws are notable in the definition of claw-free graphs, graphs that do not have any claw as an induced subgraph. They are also one of the exceptional cases of the Whitney graph isomorphism theorem: in general, graphs with isomorphic line graphs are themselves isomorphic, with the exception of the claw and the triangle . 

A star is a special kind of tree. As with any tree, stars may be encoded by a Prüfer sequence; the Prüfer sequence for a star  consists of  copies of the center vertex.

Several graph invariants are defined in terms of stars. Star arboricity is the minimum number of forests that a graph can be partitioned into such that each tree in each forest is a star, and the star chromatic number of a graph is the minimum number of colors needed to color its vertices in such a way that every two color classes together form a subgraph in which all connected components are stars. The graphs of branchwidth 1 are exactly the graphs in which each connected component is a star.

Other applications

The set of distances between the vertices of a claw provides an example of a finite metric space that cannot be embedded isometrically into a Euclidean space of any dimension.

The star network, a computer network modeled after the star graph, is important in distributed computing. 

A geometric realization of the star graph, formed by identifying the edges with intervals of some fixed length, is used as a local model of curves in tropical geometry. A tropical curve is defined to be a metric space that is locally isomorphic to a star shaped metric graph.

See also 

 Star (simplicial complex) - a generalization of the concept of a star from a graph to an arbitrary simplicial complex.

References

Trees (graph theory)
Parametric families of graphs